Princess Elisabeth Marie of Bavaria (8 January 1874 – 4 March 1957) was a member of the Bavarian Royal House of Wittelsbach

Birth and family
Elisabeth was born in Munich, Bavaria, the first child of Prince Leopold of Bavaria and his wife, Archduchess Gisela of Austria, a daughter of Austrian Emperor Franz Joseph I and Empress Elisabeth of Austria. She had one younger sister, Princess Auguste Maria of Bavaria, and two younger brothers, Prince Georg and Prince Konrad of Bavaria.

She married, 2 November 1893, at Genoa, Italy, Otto Ludwig Philipp von Seefried auf Buttenheim, Freiherr zu Hagenbach (26 September 1870 in Bamberg – 5 September 1951 at Stiebar Palace in Gresten). Elisabeth and Otto eloped and married secretly, as they knew they would never be officially permitted to marry. Not only was Otto of much lower rank than Elisabeth, he was also a Protestant. In a letter announcing the marriage to his new parents-in-law, Otto stated that he and Elisabeth were so determined not to be parted that they had felt forced to choose between elopement and mutual suicide.

Elisabeth's father, and especially her paternal grandfather, Luitpold, Prince Regent of Bavaria, were incensed upon being presented with this fait accompli. It took years for Elisabeth's relationship with her father to recover; their reconciliation was mostly due to the efforts of her mother, Gisela, and maternal grandfather, Emperor Franz Joseph. Both of the latter gave the couple their blessing after the marriage was announced, and Franz Joseph presented them with a palace near Vienna. He also appointed Otto a lieutenant of the 1st Regiment of Infantry at Troppau and raised him to the rank of Count in 1904. At the time of the elopement, Franz Joseph had written to his wife that while he was not happy about the marriage, he felt that Elisabeth had shown courage and strength of character.

The marriage proved to be a very happy one, and the couple had five children; the first, Gisela, died as a baby.  In 1908, Count Seefried auf Buttenheim inherited Castle Buttenheim in Gresten, Lower Austria, which has remained the family seat to the present day.

She died aged 83 in 1957, and was buried at the cemetery in Gresten.

Issue 

 Countess Gisela von Seefried auf Buttenheim (January 1895 in Troppau – 1895 in Troppau)
 Countess Elisabeth von Seefried auf Buttenheim (10 June 1897 – 4 August 1975)
 Countess Auguste von Seefried auf Buttenheim (20 June 1899 –21 January 1978); married in 1919 Prince Adalbert of Bavaria.
 Countess Marie Valerie von Seefried auf Buttenheim (20 August 1901 – 23 March 1972; married 1935 Wilhelm Otto von Riedemann (1903-1940), grandson of Wilhelm Anton von Riedemann.
 Count Franz Joseph von Seefried auf Buttenheim, Freiherr zu Hagenbach (29 July 1904 in Rozsahegy, Hungary – 15 May 1969, Madrid, Spain). He married on 9 August 1941, at Frankfurt am Main, Gabrielle von Schnitzler (born at München, 3 November 1918 - February 13, 2017), daughter of Georg August Eduard von Schnitzler and his wife, Lilly Bertha Dorothea von Mallinckrodt. They had four children:
 Franz, (born 1942, Frankfurt am Main).
 Ferdinand, (born 1944, Madrid, Spain).
 Isabel, (born 1949, Madrid, Spain).
 Johannes, (born 1959, Wien, Austria).

Ancestry

References

 Die Wittelsbacher. Geschichte unserer Familie. Adalbert, Prinz von Bayern. Prestel Verlag, München, (1979). Prestel Verlag 2005 edition: 462 pages and 100 illustr.  .

Nobility from Munich
House of Wittelsbach
Bavarian princesses
1874 births
1957 deaths